Acacia daphnifolia, also known as northern manna gum, is a tree or shrub belonging to the genus Acacia and the subgenus Phyllodineae that is endemic to Western Australia.

Description
It is often composed of multiple stems and can spread by root-suckering. The dull-green phyllodes are patent or occasionally sub-pendulous with an oblanceolate to narrowly elliptic shape. It blooms from May to June and produces yellow flowers. The inflorescences have spherical flower-heads that have a diameter of  containing 17 to 30 showy golden flowers with a delicate fragrance. The dull brown to black seeds have an oblong to elliptic shape.

Taxonomy
The species was first formally described by the botanist Carl Meissner in 1855 in the work Botanische Zeitung. The only synonyms are Acacia microbotrya var. borealis and Acacia subfalcata. The plant is a part of the Acacia microbotrya along with Acacia amblyophylla and Acacia splendens.

Distribution
It is native to an area in the Mid West and Wheatbelt regions of Western Australia. The plant is often situated in a variety of habitats including low hills, along the banks of creeks, around areas of saline drainage, flats and road verges where it grows in gravelly sandy-clay or loamy soils found around outcrops of granite or laterite.

See also
List of Acacia species

References

daphnifolia
Acacias of Western Australia
Plants described in 1855
Taxa named by Carl Meissner